Akumal is a small beach-front tourist resort community in Mexico, located  south of Cancún, between the towns of Playa del Carmen and  Tulum. It is located on Akumal Bay and Half Moon Bay on the site of a former coconut plantation in Tulum Municipality in the state of Quintana Roo, and is part of the Riviera Maya area. The 2010 census showed a population of 1,310 inhabitants.

Akumal is famous as a destination for snorkeling, where visitors can swim with endangered green sea turtles, who visit the shallow bay to feed on sea grass.  The popularity of snorkeling has put environmental pressure on the fragile habitat.

History
The town was officially founded in 1958 as a community for scuba divers by Pablo Bush Romero—a Mexican businessman, big game trophy hunter, diver, writer, historian, and archaeologist.  Pablo Bush's family still controls a portion of Akumal.

On March 7, 2016, Akumal Bay was declared a marine refuge to protect the threatened turtle population.

In 2018 the Akumal Arts Festival was founded. Each November this annual event brings over 120 national and international artists from Mexico for one of the largest mural festivals being produced globally.

References

External links

 Centro Ecologico Akumal

Populated places in Quintana Roo
Populated coastal places in Mexico
Tulum (municipality)
Mexican artist groups and collectives
Tourism in Mexico